This article covers the 2017–18 season for Flamurtari Vlorë. They participate in the Kategoria Superiore and the Albanian Cup.

Current squad

Competitions

Kategoria Superiore

League table

Results summary

Results by round

Matches

1st quarter:

Skënderbeu 2-0 Flamurtari

Flamurtari 3-1 Lushnja

Teuta 1-2 Flamurtari

Flamurtari 0-0 Luftëtari

Vllaznia 1-1 Flamurtari

Laçi 1-1 Flamurtari

Flamurtari 1-0 Kamza

Partizani 0-1 Flamurtari

Flamurtari 1-1 Kukësi

2nd quarter:

Flamurtari 1-1 Skënderbeu

Lushnja 0-1 Flamurtari

Flamurtari 0-0 Teuta

Luftëtari 1-1 Flamurtari

Flamurtari 2-0 Vllaznia

Flamurtari 0-1 Laçi

Kamza 0-3 Flamurtari

Flamurtari 1-0 Partizani

Kukësi 1-1 Flamurtari

3rd quarter:

Skënderbeu 1-0 Flamurtari

Flamurtari 2-0 Lushnja

Teuta 0-0 Flamurtari

Flamurtari 0-1 Luftëtari

Vllaznia 3-0 Flamurtari

Laçi 4-2 Flamurtari

Flamurtari 2-2 Kamza

Partizani 1-0 Flamurtari

Flamurtari 1-2 Kukësi

4th quarter:

Flamurtari 0-3 Skënderbeu

Lushnja 0-2 Flamurtari

Flamurtari 3-1 Teuta

Luftëtari 2-1 Flamurtari

Flamurtari 1-1 Vllaznia

Flamurtari 0-0 Laçi

Kamza 1-0 Flamurtari

Flamurtari 1-2 Partizani

Kukësi 2-2 Flamurtari

Albanian Cup

First round

Dinamo Tirana 0-2 Flamurtari

Flamurtari 4-1 Dinamo Tirana

Aggregate: Dinamo 1-6  Flamurtari

Second round

Turbina 1-6 Flamurtari

Flamurtari 5-2 Turbina

Aggregate: Turbina 3-11 Flamurtari

Quarter-finals

Flamurtari 1-0 Partizani

Partizani 2-1 Flamurtari

Aggregate: Flamurtari 2-2 (a) Partizani

Semi-Finals

Skënderbeu 0-1 Flamurtari

Flamurtari 0-2 Skënderbeu 

Aggregate: Flamurtari 1-2 Skënderbeu

References

Flamurtari Vlorë seasons
Flamurtari Vlorë